Aberdeen F.C. competed in the Scottish Premier Division, Scottish League Cup, Scottish Cup and UEFA Europa League in season 1996–97.

Results

Scottish Premier Division

Final standings

Scottish League Cup

Scottish Cup

UEFA Cup

References

 afcheritage.org 

Aberdeen F.C. seasons
Aberdeen